The push of pike was a particular feature of late medieval and Early Modern warfare that occurred when two opposing columns of pikemen (often Swiss mercenaries or German Landsknechte) met and became locked in position along a front of interleaved pikes.

Shoving match 
During push of pike, opposing blocks of pikemen would advance with their pikes "charged" horizontally at shoulder level to jab at one another until bodily contact was made. The two sides would then push physically until one or other of them gave way. The push of pike would continue until one of the opposing formations routed or fled, which would generally lead to massive casualties. Each man pressed on the one in front, and so sometimes the formations would crush against each other and many pikemen would have to fight in closer melee combat. The rear ranks would sometimes join the fray but their primary role was to add more weight to the push. Aside from getting impaled by enemy pikes, those in the front ranks died from getting crushed or suffocated due to the sheer number of bodies pressing from each side. The Italians referred to this as 'Bad War' after seeing Swiss pikemen become locked in thick combat, where – because both formations refused to back down – both sides lost huge numbers of men in the bloody melee.

There are instances when both sides agree to a break for a short rest then the pikemen resume their clash. Rodeleros along with the Doppelsöldner were used in order to break push of pike engagements. The push of pike still played a role in the English civil war; two-thirds of the infantry consisted of pikemen at the start of the war, declining to one-third as the war progressed and the matchlock gained dominance. Pikemen often cut down the lengths of their pikes in order to make them more manageable. This habit had on many occasions disastrous consequences as the side with the longest pikes had the advantage during push of pike.

The push of pike was still crucial and decided the outcome of battles from the 14th century up to the early part of the 18th century.

Battles involving push of pike

Battle of Arbedo (1422)

Italian Wars:
 Battle of Ravenna (1512)
 Battle of Novara (1513)
 Battle of Pavia (1525)
 Battle of Ceresole (1544)

Marian civil war:
Battle of Langside (1568)

Anglo-Spanish War (1585–1604):
Battle of Santo Domingo (1586)

Eighty Years' War:
Battle of Zutphen (1586)
Battle of Nieuwpoort (1600)

English Civil War:
Battle of Stratton (1643)

Irish Confederate Wars:
Battle of Benburb (1646)

References

External links
 

Warfare of the Early Modern period